The 1999 French Figure Skating Championships took place between 18 and 20 December 1998 in Lyon. Skaters competed in the disciplines of men's singles, women's singles, pair skating, and ice dancing on the senior level. The event was used to help determine the French team to the 1999 World Championships and the 1999 European Championships.

Results

Men

Ladies

Pairs

Ice dancing

External links
 results

1998 in figure skating
French Figure Skating Championships, 1999
French Figure Skating Championships
1999 in French sport